Summit is a small unincorporated community more frequently referred to by locals as the Loma Prieta Community located partially in Santa Clara County but predominantly in Santa Cruz County, California, in the mountain ranges of the Santa Cruz Mountains. It lies at the summit along Highway 17 from which is gets its name. Home to a series of abandoned railroad towns and tunnels from a Los Gatos to Felton route before the 1940s, Public transportation by bus is also no longer available from the Summit Road area. VTA route 76 has been cancelled since June 2010, and the Highway 17 Express only stops in Scotts Valley. It is one of the few places in the San Francisco Bay Area to receive snowfall and the mountain pass which links the Silicon Valley and Monterey Bay is closed at this spot when snowfall is too heavy. The next town to the south is Scotts Valley and to the north Redwood Estates. The area serves as a rest stop with food for people traveling across the mountains. It straddles the county line with Santa Clara County and is south of the unincorporated area of Lexington Hills with which it shares a zip code. The ZIP Code is 95033 and the community is inside area code 408.

Notes

Unincorporated communities in California
Unincorporated communities in Santa Cruz County, California